Happy Time is a Philippine noontime variety show broadcast by Net 25. The program premiered on September 14, 2020, and is presented by comedian Anjo Yllana. The newest noontime variety show on Philippine television before TV5's Lunch Out Loud (and first of Net 25) joins the ranks of established programs such as Eat Bulaga! (of which its male hosts are alumni of), It's Showtime, Wowowee, and Wowowin, incorporating tried-and-tested elements while crafting its own unique identity to allure and assist the viewing public during the COVID-19 pandemic.

Happy Time also served as the reunion project of Gibbs and Yllana following their previous television series, the sitcoms Ober Da Bakod, Beh Bote Nga, comedy program Nuts Entertainment, and the aforementioned veteran noontime show Eat Bulaga!.

On October 15, 2021, Happy Time is cancelled due to a low ratings and loss of advertiser's support, to give way for News and Public Affairs programs on Net 25 under the TVRadyo banner.

Hosts

Final Hosts
 Boobsie Wonderland 
 CJ Hirro 
 Dingdong Avanzado

Segment Hosts
 Aikee 
 Nelvin Pascua a.k.a. Alvin Chorizo

Guest Hosts
 Mico Aytona

Former Hosts
 Anjo Yllana 
 Janno Gibbs  
 Kitkat

Segments

Final Segments
 Bawal Peyk News
 Kanta-nungan
 Mask-Sunurin of the Day
 PM is the Key
 Sana All
 Sing Song with Dingdong

Former Segments
 Ayuda Juan
 Hanger Games
 Janno Gives...
 Maalis Taya

See also
List of programs broadcast by Net 25

References

Net 25 original programming
2020 Philippine television series debuts
2020s Philippine television series
Philippine variety television shows
Filipino-language television shows